Central Kentucky Regional Airport (formerly Madison Airport)  is a public airport  from Richmond, Kentucky, in Madison County, Kentucky. It is owned by the Madison Airport Board.

Facilities and aircraft
Central Kentucky Regional Airport covers 197 acres (80 ha) at an elevation of 1,002 feet (305 m) above mean sea level. It has one asphalt runway, 18/36, 5,001 by 100 feet (1,524 x 30 m).

In the year ending August 2, 2012 the airport had 31,270 aircraft operations, average 85 per day: 94% general aviation, 5% air taxi, and 1% military. 25 aircraft were then based at this airport: 92% single-engine and 8% multi-engine.

References

External links
 
 Aerial image as of March 1998 from USGS The National Map
 
 

Airports in Kentucky
Buildings and structures in Madison County, Kentucky
Transportation in Madison County, Kentucky